The 2014–15 Hertha BSC season is the 122nd season in club history.

Background

Background information

Hertha BSC finished the 2013–14 Bundesliga in eleventh place, thus ensuring a place in the 2014–15 Bundesliga. Tolga Ciğerci and Jens Hegeler transferred to Hertha. Adrián Ramos and Maik Franz left Hertha. Levan Kobiashvili retired after the 2013–14 season.

On 5 February 2015, Hertha sacked Jos Luhukay, naming Pál Dárdai as replacement along with assistant Rainer Widmayer. Hertha had lost 1–0 the previous day.

Transfers

In

Out

Friendlies

Bundesliga

League table

Results summary

Bundesliga fixtures & results

DFB-Pokal

DFB-Pokal review
Hertha BSC were drawn against Regionalliga side FC Viktoria Köln in the first round, the match will be played in Cologne. They will play Arminia Bielefeld in the second round.

DFB-Pokal results

Player informations

 

|-
|colspan="10"|Players who left the club during the 2014–15 season
|-

|}

Notes

1.Kickoff time in Central European Time/Central European Summer Time.
2.Hertha BSC's goals first.

References

Hertha BSC
Hertha BSC seasons